Jennifer Hale is a Canadian-American voice actress  best known for her work in video game series including Baldur's Gate, Mass Effect, Metal Gear Solid, Spider-Man, BioShock Infinite, and Star Wars: Knights of the Old Republic. In 2013, she was recognized by Guinness World Records as "the most prolific video game voice actor (female)".

Voice-over filmography

Animation

Feature film

Direct-to-video and television films

Video games

Other voice roles

Live-action filmography

Notes

References

Book references

External links
 
 
 
 

Actress filmographies
American filmographies
Canadian filmographies